Gianfranco Lazzer (born 4 July 1955 in Vicenza, Veneto) is a former Italian sprinter.

Biography
He won three medals  at the International athletics competitions, of these two with the national relay team. He has 16 caps in national team from 1979 to 1983.

Achievements

National titles
In the "Pietro Mennea era", Gianfranco Lazzer has won one time the individual national championship.
1 win in the 60 metres indoor (1980)

See also
 Italy national relay team

References

External links
 

1955 births
Living people
Italian male sprinters
Athletics competitors of Fiamme Oro
Mediterranean Games gold medalists for Italy
Mediterranean Games silver medalists for Italy
Athletes (track and field) at the 1979 Mediterranean Games
Universiade medalists in athletics (track and field)
Mediterranean Games medalists in athletics
Universiade gold medalists for Italy
Medalists at the 1979 Summer Universiade